The Weddings, Barmitzvahs & Stadiums Tour is the  concert tour by British singer Robbie Williams, in support of his third studio album, Sing When You're Winning (2000). The second leg of the tour was renamed to Sing When You're Pacific Rimming Tour and Williams visited Australasia and Asia for the first time.

Background
Two months after the release of Sing When You're Winning, Robbie hit the road for his second set of UK arena dates. With the release of Rock DJ earning him his third UK No. 1, Robbie's success was still soaring! Tickets for the arena shows were at this point described as gold dust and were selling out within hours.

In the run up to the tour, Robbie performed to 400 people at an exclusive Radio 1 show at  London club, Scala. Prior to the gig Robbie revealed how the pressures of fame were taking their toll: "I do think that it doesn't stay like this forever, this amount of record sales and this notoriety. And while it is this big I really should get out of the country for a little bit. I love this country", he said, "I think it's fantastic, but life does get a bit like The Truman Show. People know when I've farted before I have. It is a bit of a mindbender."

In a haze of jaded negativity, Robbie began the European dates of the tour unfulfilled and disillusioned by the rigmarole of life in the limelight.

"I'm struggling to find things about my job that I enjoy", he said. "The money is fantastic, but that's the only thing that's great about it at the moment."

Writer Mark McCrum, who joined the tour as fodder for Robbie's first full-length, authorised biography, Somebody Someday, said: "This tour was made all the more interesting by the fact that Robbie announced at the start his intention to leave drink and drugs behind forever. His attempt to stay clean while performing was the personal challenge that became the story of the book."

This leg of the tour was also the subject of Brian Hill's documentary, Nobody Someday, and it was obvious that Robbie was finding the added attention intrusive. But it was also the tour during which Robbie did most of his growing up. Show after show, somehow, despite his weary state of mind, Robbie managed to stick to his
word and stay clean. As a result, he began to enjoy himself.

By Rotterdam he started to get job satisfaction and ended the tour on a positive note. Having faced his demons, remaining sober and clean, he resisted the temptation to fall back into his old ways to celebrate once the tour was over.

Set list 
 "Let Me Entertain You"
 "Live and Let Die"+
 "Old Before I Die"
 "Better Man"
 "Strong" 
 "Wimmin"
 "Eternity/The Road to Mandalay"
 "Forever Texas"
 "No Regrets (Robbie Williams song)" / "Kill You"
 "Supreme"
 "Let Love Be Your Energy"
 "Kids" 
 "She's the One"
 "Millennium"
 "Angels"
 "Rock DJ"

Tour dates
Weddings, Barmitzvahs & Stadiums

Sing When You're Pacific Rimming

Notes

References

Robbie Williams concert tours
2001 concert tours